The Master Cutler is the head of the Company of Cutlers in Hallamshire established in 1624. Their role is to act as an ambassador of industry in Sheffield, England. The Master Cutler is elected by the freemen of the company on the first Monday of September of each year and the position taken in the first Tuesday of October. Despite the title, the Master Cutler does not have to be involved in the cutlery business, or even the steel industry, to be elected.

The first Master Cutler was Robert Sorsby (1577–1643).  His son, Malin Sorsby, was Master Cutler in 1647, and in turn his son Robert Sorsby took the office in 1669.  Another Robert Sorsby, a cousin of the first, held the post in 1628.

The Installation of the new Master Cutler and Company follows the annual election of the new Company. In the early years of the Company, the Election, Installation, Church Service and celebratory meal (which eventually became the Cutlers’ Feast) all happened on the same day. Now, only the Installation and Church Service, followed by lunch, take place on the same day.

The Master Cutler for 2022–2023 is Dame Julie Kenny.

List of Masters Cutler

Notable and recent Masters Cutler have included:

1624 Robert Sorsby
1662 James Staniforth
1790 Joseph Ward
1798 Samuel Broomhead Ward
1808 Ebenezer Rhodes
1816 Thomas Asline Ward
1855 Frederick Mappin
1863 Thomas Jessop
1865–66 Sir John Brown
1867-9 Mark Firth
1870 William Bragge
1872 Thomas Vickers
1880 William Chesterman
1899 Robert Hadfield
1902 Albert J. Hobson
1908 Douglas Vickers
1911 Arthur Balfour
1913 Thomas William Ward
1914–18 William Henry Ellis
1919 Henry Kenyon Stephenson
1932 Arthur Lee
1935 Samuel Roberts
1958 Hugh Neill
1974 Ken Lewis
1998 Douglas and Pamela Liversidge (Master and Mistress Cutler)
1999 H. Stuart Johnson
2000 Vernon Smith
2001 Richard Prest
2002 John Bramah
2003 Neil Turner
2004 John Tissiman
2005 Timothy Reed
2006 Alan Reid
2007 Gordon W. Bridge
2008 Martin G. Howell
2009 James Newman
2010 William Speirs
2011 Pamela Liversidge
2012 Neil MacDonald
2013 Tony Pedder
2014 David Grey
2015 Craig McKay
2016 Richard Edwards
2017/18 Ken Cooke
2018/19 Nicholas Cragg
2019–2021  Nicholas D. O. Williams (Serving twice due to the COVID-19 pandemic)
2021–2022 James Andrew Tear
2022–2023 Dame Julie Kenny

The eponymous train
In 1947 at a meeting of the Company of Cutlers in Hallamshire Ronald Matthews, a former holder of the office and Chairman of the London and North Eastern Railway suggested that the 7.40  train from Sheffield Victoria to London Marylebone, returning at 18.15, should be named after the Master Cutler. This was agreed by both the Company of Cutlers and the LNER. The then Master Cutler, A Balfour, later the 2nd Lord Riverdale, rode on the footplate of the inaugural train. It has since been a tradition that the Master Cutler ride with the driver of the train during their year of office. Upon nationalisation in 1948, the service became the responsibility of the Eastern Region of British Railways. Known to staff simply as "The Cutler", the train carried a restaurant car and was generally hauled by a Gresley A3 Pacific.

References

Mayors, Lord Mayors and Master Cutlers

Further reading
Clyde Binfield, David Hey (1997) Mesters to Masters: A History of the Company of Cutlers in Hallamshire (Oxford University Press)

External links
Company of Cutlers in Hallamshire

Economy of Sheffield